Paul William Barnett  (born 23 September 1935) is an Australian Anglican bishop, ancient historian and New Testament scholar. He was the Bishop of North Sydney from 1990 to 2001. He is a prominent historical writer on the rise of Christianity and the historical Jesus. He is currently a fellow in ancient history at Macquarie University in Sydney, Australia and a teaching fellow at Regent College, Vancouver, Canada.

Background
Barnett holds a Master of Arts (MA Hons) from the University of Sydney, a Licentiate in Theology (ThL) from the Australian College of Theology, a Bachelor of Divinity (BD Hons) and a Doctor of Philosophy (PhD; London) on the interaction between the New Testament and Jewish history of the first century. His dissertation at the University of London was titled "The Jewish eschatalogical prophets A.D. 40-70 in their theological and political setting". "[He is] now a teaching fellow at Regent College, Vancouver, [and] is a respected classicist and historian."

Barnett was ordained in 1965 and ministered at St Barnabas' Broadway in Sydney and Holy Trinity Church in North Terrace, Adelaide before becoming the master of Robert Menzies College at Macquarie University from 1980. He was later the chairman of the New Documents Illustrating early Christianity project which is now in its 10th volume. The ninth volume was dedicated to Barnett and contains an introduction on his impact on New Testament ancient history by Edwin Judge. He is married to Anita Barnett. He has 4 children and 11 grandchildren.

Barnett was made a Member of the Order of Australia in the 2019 Queen's Birthday Honours.

Bibliography
Is the New Testament History?. Hodder & Stoughton, 1986. Revised Edition: Aquila, 2004. 
Bethlehem to Patmos. Hodder & Stoughton, 1989. Revised Edition: Paternoster, 2013. 
Apocalypse Now and Then: Reading Revelation Today (Reading the Bible Today Commentaries). 1989. Reprinted, Aquila Press, 2001. 
The Servant King: Reading Mark Today. 1991.  
The Truth about Jesus. First Edition 1994. Second Edition: Aquila, 2004. 
The Second Letter of Paul to the Corinthians NIC. 1997.
Jesus and the Logic of History. Leicester: IVP (UK). 1997.
Jesus and the Rise of Early Christianity. IVP Academic, 1999. 
The Shepherd King: reading John today. Aquila Press, 2005. 
Living Hope: Reading 1 Peter today. Aquila Press, 2006. 
The Birth of Christianity. Eerdmans, 2006. 
Paul, Missionary of Jesus. Eerdmans, 2006. 
Finding the Historical Christ. Eerdmans, 2009. 
Messiah. Intervarsity Press, 2009. 
The Corinthian Question. Apollos, 2011. 
1 Corinthians: Holiness and Hope of a Rescued People (Focus on the Bible). Christian Focus, 2011.

References

1935 births
Living people
Alumni of the Theological Department of King's College London
Academic staff of Moore Theological College
Academic staff of Macquarie University
20th-century Anglican bishops in Australia
Assistant bishops in the Anglican Diocese of Sydney
Australian biblical scholars
University of Sydney alumni
Anglican biblical scholars
Evangelical Anglican bishops
Members of the Order of Australia
Bible commentators